Little Jacques (French: Le petit Jacques) is a 1934 French drama film directed by Gaston Roudès and starring Constant Rémy, Line Noro and Jacques Varennes.

The film's sets were designed by Jean d'Eaubonne.

Cast
 Constant Rémy as Noël Rambert  
 Line Noro  as Marthe Rambert  
 Jacques Varennes as Daniel Mortal  
 Annie Ducaux as Claire Mortal  
 Gaby Triquet as  Le petit Jacques  
 Madeleine Guitty as La concierge  
 Pauline Carton as Mademoiselle Julie  
 Lucien Gallas as Paul Laverdac  
 Jean Dax as Le juge d'instruction 
 Jean Joffre as Docteur Arthez  
 Gaston Dupray as L'avocat  
 Louis Charco as Denis Gobergeau 
 Jacques Berlioz

References

Bibliography 
 Dayna Oscherwitz & MaryEllen Higgins. The A to Z of French Cinema. Scarecrow Press, 2009.

External links 
 

1934 drama films
French drama films
1934 films
1930s French-language films
Films directed by Gaston Roudès
1930s French films